Gauna mediolineata is a species of snout moth in the genus Gauna. It was described by George Hampson in 1903 and is known from northern India.

References

Moths described in 1903
Pyralini